Terellia montana is a species of tephritid or fruit flies in the genus Terellia of the family Tephritidae.

Distribution
Kazakhstan.

References

Tephritinae
Insects described in 2006
Diptera of Asia